James Emerton Joyce  was a rugby union player who represented Australia.

Joyce, a lock, claimed one international rugby cap for Australia. His debut game was against New Zealand, at Sydney, on 15 August 1903.

References

Australian rugby union players
Australia international rugby union players
Date of birth unknown
Rugby union locks